Akane the Kunoichi is a platform game developed by indepdendent Italian studio Haruneko. It was released for the Xbox 360's Xbox Live Indie Games service in 2011 and was ported as a budget title for the Microsoft Windows (Steam and Desura), Windows Phone 7, and iOS.

Plot
The game's protagonist Akane is a kunoichi who secretly loves her feudal master Goro. When he is kidnapped, Akane goes off to rescue him from the evil Hiromi and her minions.

Reception
Akane the Kunoichi was met with mostly favourable critical reception, including being a finalist at Dream Build Play 2012 in the Windows Phone category. Game Informer described the Xbox 360 version as a "fine" example of an "old-school platformer" for "one measly dollar". Daniel Douvris of AppAdvice commented on the iOS version of the game: "Akane the Kunoichi is a fun action platformer. Its platforming elements, as well as its artwork, are reminiscent of retro games of the past. Put simply, it is a breath of fresh air from the endless piles of junk that line the App Store these days."

References

External links
Official website
Akane the Kunoichi at MobyGames
Akane the Kunoichi at Hardcore Gaming 101

2011 video games
Fantasy video games
IOS games
Indie video games
Microsoft XNA games
Video games about ninja
Retro-style video games
Side-scrolling platform games
Single-player video games
Steam Greenlight games
Video games developed in Italy
Video games featuring female protagonists
Video games set in feudal Japan
Windows games
Windows Phone games
Xbox 360 games
Xbox 360 Live Indie games
Platform games
Japan in non-Japanese culture